Hudsonville may refer to the following places:

Hudsonville, Indiana, an unincorporated community
Hudsonville, Michigan, a city
Hudsonville, Mississippi, an unincorporated community